Dar El Kebdani (Tarifit: Dar Lkebdani, Kebdani, ⴷⴰⵔ ⵍⴽⴻⴱⴷⴰⵏⵉ; Arabic: دار الكبداني) is a town in Driouch Province, Oriental, Morocco. According to the 2014 census, it has a population of 9,911.

References

Populated places in Driouch Province